Bjørnebye is a Norwegian surname. Notable people with the surname include:

John Bjørnebye (1941–2017), Norwegian diplomat
Jo Inge Bjørnebye (1946–2013), Norwegian ski jumper
Stig Inge Bjørnebye (born 1969), Norwegian footballer

Norwegian-language surnames